Fenggang Yang (born 1962) is professor of sociology and founding director of the Center on Religion and Chinese Society at Purdue University. He was elected and served as the president of the Society for the Scientific Study of Religion in 2014–15, the first Chinese American, nonwhite president since the founding of the association in 1949. He is also the founding president of the East Asian Society for the Scientific Study of Religion in 2018–2020. He has been listed in the Marquis' Who's Who in America since 2002. Fenggang Yang is openly Christian and has spoken critically and frequently in international media about China's lack of religious freedom. His theories based on the social scientific methods have been criticized as biased in favor of Christianity by many other scholars of Chinese religion who are in religious studies, anthropology or sinology. He is known for his theory of a triple "religious market" in China.

Triple "religious market" theory
In 2006, Yang advanced the theory that, under heavy regulation, various religions are divided into three "markets": a "red market" of recognized religions, including the five officially approved religions of Buddhism, Daoism, Islam, Catholicism, and Protestant Christianity, a "gray market" of unrecognized and legally undefined religions, including folk religions and others, and a "black market" of illegal religions, including what the Chinese government has called xiejiao (evil cults). According to him, the more the red market is controlled and co-opted by the state, the more this leads to the growth of the black and the gray markets.

"Shortage Economy" theory
In 2010, Yang further articulates a theory of "shortage economy," arguing that when religious supply was suppressed by the state, religious demand was reduced to some extent, but also expressed as forced substitution, semi-forced substitution, searching for alternatives, and searching for religion. He claims that he borrows the shortage economic concepts by economist Janos Kornai, but Kornai's economics focus on the supply-side. In contrast, Yang's theory focus on the demand side, claiming that the shortage economy of religion explains the churning of alternative spiritualities as well as conventional religions in Communist China. The supply-side theorists, such as sociologists Rodney Stark and Roger Finke, and economist Lawrence Iannoccone, strongly disagree on this theory.

Criticism
The Center on Religion and Chinese Society is funded by the Templeton Foundation, an American organization open to Christian-related research in the field of religious studies. Fenggang Yang was funded by the Templeton Foundation to develop his projects. His statistics and projections about Christianity in China have been disputed by authorities in China and scholars including Shen Guiping. In 2014 he claimed that "China will be home to the world's largest Christian congregation by 2030", despite in 2010 he said that "Christians remain a small minority in China today", based on a survey which found that they were "33 million, much less than most of the popular speculations". Surveys conducted in 2014 by Chinese research institutes found a similar number of Christians, or around 2% of the population. The 2014 claim was, as proclaimed by Yang himself, "based on the Pew Research Center's report of Global Christianity", another project backed by the Templeton Foundation.

Many scholars of Chinese religion, including Lu Yunfeng, Ji Zhe, Stephan Feuchtwang, Wang Mingming, Adam Chau, Yang Der-ruey, Qu Jingdong, Chen Jinguo, Liang Yongjia and Cao Nanlai, have been critic of Fenggang Yang's theories about religion in China. According to them, Yang's theories are modeled on Christianity, reduce religion to a mere social phenomenon (he defines religion as "a unified system of beliefs and practices about life and the world relative to the supernatural") and miss the Chinese and English anthropological research of the last century.

Ji Zhe has criticized them as "a projection of fantasy with a certain kind of Christian root". According to Liang Yongjia, Yang's "religious market" theory rests upon a distinction of "politics" and "religion" that is typical of liberal systems but not of Chinese culture. The theory also has an intrinsic idea of "competition" between religions that is typical of Abrahamic religions such as Christianity, but unknown to the nature of Chinese society, in which grassroots non-institutional religions prevail. Furthermore, Yang wrongly considers post-1949 China's governance of religion to be different from that of pre-1949 China. Another critique expressed by Liang is that Yang's theories imply that folk religions are an "inferior" form of religion, while his definition of "(true) religion" is a Biblical/Christian one. Ultimately, Yang's "religious market" theory is regarded as functional to the neoliberal construction of the market economy.

The limitations of Yang's theories have also been illustrated by Vincent Goossaert, a scholar of Chinese religion at the École pratique des hautes études in Paris. He speaks of a "total absence of historical reflexion", in Yang's studies, about Buddhism and Taoism, but especially Chinese folk religions. The latter, which comprise cultural communities devoted to local deities and individual spiritual techniques, are classified by Yang as the legally undefined "gray market" of "semi-, quasi- and pseudo-religions", standing between the fully legal "red market" of what Yang considers "true religions" (whose prototype is Christianity) and the illegal "black market" of religions forbidden by the Chinese government (such as Falun Gong and Eastern Lightning). Yang claims that contemporary China's policies on religion hamper the growth of the red and black markets while leaving free space for the gray market to develop, and if China will liberalize religion completely, the "religious consumers" would mostly turn to "true religions". Goossaert rebuts that folk religions are not inferior forms of religion, have deep historical roots and a history of negotiation with the government, and are the largest form of religion in contemporary China, far from being "consumer goods" ready to be replaced by better ones.

The Chinese scholar Mou Zhongjian advanced an alternative paradigm to that of the "religious market", actually preceding the latter in time. In 2006, Mou put forward the model of "religious ecology" for the study of religion in China, which has been welcomed ad developed by a number of other scholars, including Chen Xiaoyi and Li Xiangping. Mou's theory is based upon Julian Steward's idea of multilinear evolution and views Chinese religions as a self-contained and internally structured "social life system", which continuously develops through internal renewal and external interactions, with no distinction between the "religious" and the "secular" realm.

Selected works

References

External links
 Center on Religion and Chinese Society
 East Asian Society for the Scientific Study of Religion

1962 births
Living people
American academics of Chinese descent
American Christians
American sociologists
Chinese emigrants to the United States
Chinese sociologists
Purdue University faculty
Scholars of Chinese religions
Presidents of the Society for the Scientific Study of Religion
Sociologists of religion